Cyril Sidlow (26 November 1915 – 12 April 2005) was a Welsh football goalkeeper. He played for several football clubs, most notably Wolverhampton Wanderers and Liverpool.

Life and playing career 
Sidlow was born in Colwyn Bay, Conwy, North Wales. He played for Llandudno, Colwyn Bay and Wolverhampton Wanderers. He was signed by the Wolves in 1937 by Major Frank Buckley. Sidlow was the first choice Wolves keeper before the war, but the signing of Bert Williams after the war limited his chances. His career included a notable international match between England and Wales at Ninian Park where Wolves supplied both the England keeper (Williams) and Welsh keeper (Sidlow). 

With the Wolves having two international keepers, this led to Sidlow being surplus to requirements. However, a recognized international, Liverpool manager George Kay signed him for a then record £4000 in February 1946. Sidlow made his debut for Liverpool on 31 August 1946 in a league match at Bramall Lane, and kept his first clean sheet for the club, with Len Carney scoring a late goal for the Reds in the 90th minute.

At the age of 24, Sidlow's career was curtailed with the beginning of the Second World War. He was almost 31 when he re-signed for the Reds. Sidlow with Charlie Ashcroft and Ray Minshull were the goalkeepers vying for the number one jersey at Anfield for the 1946/47 season: the first competitive season following the war. Even with the competition, Sidlow was given the position, which he held for 34 of the 42 games in a season that saw Liverpool win their first championship in 24 years. Much of which is owed to Sidlow as the final game of the season was a must win for the Reds. Sidlow's former employers, the Wolves, needed just a point to win the title and Liverpool had to face them at Molineux. The Reds were a point back on their hosts and needed a victory to win the league title. After a comprehensive 5–0 win at Anfield, Wolves were favorites to win the game and take the title, but goals from Jack Balmer and Albert Stubbins, plus Sidlow and the backline keeping Wolves down to one goal meant the Championship trophy would be heading to Merseyside.

Sidlow tasted disappointment with the Reds too when they reached their first Wembley final in 1950, Arsenal where the opposition who took the FA Cup back to Highbury after a 2–0 win. Sidlow's Liverpool days were drawn to a close during the 1950/51 after he originally begun the season as first choice. Charlie Ahcroft and Russell Crossley took over for four games before Sidlow came back in to play his last match for the club, Anfield was the place and Newcastle United were the visitors. Things didn't go well for Sidlow and the Reds as The Magpies went back to St James' Park with the points after a 4–2 win. Crossley came back into the side and Sidlow retired in the August 1952, upon retirement from the top level, he went on to play for New Brighton.

Sidlow earned seven caps for Wales during his career.

Memorial 
After his death his daughter sponsored a local award in Perton and Codsall, where her father lived until his death, to recognize local players achievements.

Career details

Wolverhampton Wanderers F.C. (1937–1946)
Liverpool F.C. (1946–1952) - 165 appearances - Football League Championship (level 1) winners medal (1947), FA Cup runners-up medal (1950)
Wales 7 caps

References

External links
Player profile at LFChistory.net

1915 births
2005 deaths
People from Colwyn Bay
Sportspeople from Conwy County Borough
Welsh footballers
Colwyn Bay F.C. players
Wales international footballers
Association football goalkeepers
Wolverhampton Wanderers F.C. players
Liverpool F.C. players
New Brighton A.F.C. players
English Football League players
FA Cup Final players